Artyom Viktorovich Prokhorov (born 10 May 1989) is a former Russian professional football player.

Club career
He played 3 seasons in the Russian Football National League for FC Salyut Belgorod.

External links
 
 

1989 births
Living people
Russian footballers
Association football forwards
FC Salyut Belgorod players